Furen may refer to:

Fūren, Hokkaido, town Hokkaido, Japan
Lake Furen, lake in Hokkaido, Japan
Furen Point, rocky point in Antarctica
Furen University, or Fu Jen Catholic University, university in Taiwan
Furen Literary Society, Hong Kong organization